Paravulsor is a monotypic genus of South American araneomorph spiders in the family Xenoctenidae, containing the single species, Paravulsor impudicus. It was first described by Cândido Firmino de Mello-Leitão in 1922, and has only been found in Brazil. Originally placed with the wandering spiders, it was moved to the Miturgidae in 2014, and to the Xenoctenidae in 2017.

References

Monotypic Araneomorphae genera
Spiders of Brazil
Taxa named by Cândido Firmino de Mello-Leitão
Xenoctenidae